The Australia Service Medal 1939–1945 recognises service in Australia's armed forces, Mercantile Marine and Volunteer Defence Corps during World War II.

Award criteria
Gazetted in November 1949, initially, the qualifying period was at least 18 months full-time service at home or overseas, or at least three years part-time service, between 3 September 1939 and 2 September 1945. There was no minimum qualifying period for those killed, wounded or disabled due to service. On 16 August 1996, the qualifying period was reduced to 30 days for full-time service and 90 days for part-time service.

Australian Forces also qualified for the campaign stars and medals authorised for British and Commonwealth Forces, with the Australia Service Medal worn immediately after the War Medal 1939–1945.

Description
 The Australia Service Medal 1939–1945 is a circular silver medal,  in diameter.
 The obverse bears the crowned effigy of King George VI, surrounded by the inscription 'GEORGIVS VI D:G:BR:OMN:REX ET INDIAE IMP'.
 The reverse shows the coat of arms of the Commonwealth of Australia surrounded by the words 'THE AUSTRALIA SERVICE MEDAL 1939–1945'.
The khaki represents the Army, and the red, dark blue and light blue represent the Mercantile Marine, Navy and Air Force respectively.

Medals were awarded with the recipient's name impressed on the rim.

See also
Australian Honours Order of Precedence
Australian campaign medals

References

External links
ADF Honours and Awards site
It's an Honour – Australian Government site

Australian campaign medals
1949 establishments in Australia
Australia in World War II
Awards established in 1949
Military awards and decorations of World War II